IX Turkmenistan President Cup (2003)

Group A

Group B

Third Place

Final 

 

2003
President
2003 in Belarusian football
2003 in Armenian football
2003 in Kazakhstani football
2003 in Lithuanian football
2003 in Russian football
2003 in Estonian football